Onyeka Nubia  is a British historian, writer and lecturer. Writing under the pen name Onyeka, his works explore the history of Black British people, and multiculturalism in the United Kingdom. In 2013, he published the non-fiction work Blackamoores: Africans in Tudor England, their Presence, Status and Origins, which detailed the history of Black people in Tudor England.

Career
Onyeka's third novel, The Phoenix, was awarded the 2009 African Achievers award for Communication and Media for the psychological portrayal of the Black British experience. 

In 2009 Onyeka was featured on the television programme Shoot the Messenger on the TV channel VoxAfrica, discussing the experience of the African diaspora.

Writings

Fiction

Novels
Waiting to Explode – How to Stay Alive, Narrative Eye (1998) 
The Black Prince – Leopards in the Temple, Narrative Eye (1999) 
The Phoenix – Misrule in the Land of Nod, Narrative Eye (2008)

Plays
The Great Challenge (1992–1994) - National tour
The Whirlwind and the Storm (2001) - Cochrane and Shaw Theatres
Young Othello (2016)

Non-fiction
Blackamoores: Africans in Tudor England, their Presence, Status and Origins, Narrative Eye (2013)

References

External links
 

Black British writers
English dramatists and playwrights
Living people
20th-century English novelists
21st-century British novelists
English male dramatists and playwrights
English male novelists
20th-century English male writers
21st-century English male writers
English people of Nigerian descent
Year of birth missing (living people)